Defending champion Ivan Lendl successfully defended his title, defeating John McEnroe in the final, 6–4, 6–4, 6–2 to win the singles title at the 1982 Volvo Masters.

Draw

Finals

See also
ATP World Tour Finals appearances

External links
 ITF tournament edition details

Singles

fr:Masters de tennis masculin 1982